Lisewo  is a village in the administrative district of Gmina Płońsk, within Płońsk County, Masovian Voivodeship, in east-central Poland.

The village has a population of 240.

References

Lisewo